Fusa Tomita (10 October 1893 – 19 July 1954) was a Japanese physician and politician. She was one of the first group of women elected to the House of Representatives in 1946.

Biography
Tomita was born in Matsuoka in 1893. She attended Tokyo Women's Medical College and became an obstetrician and gynecologist. She also ran a geisha house. During World War II she was involved in the Patriotic Women's Association.

After the war, Tomita joined the Liberal Party and was a candidate for the party in Kyoto in the 1946 general elections, the first in which women could vote. Running on the slogan "What's wrong with geishas?", she was elected to the House of Representatives. After the election she was charged with door-to-door canvassing during the election campaign and was fined 500 yen. She attempted to run as a Democratic Party candidate in the 1947 elections, but was rejected.

She died in 1954.

References

1893 births
Japanese gynaecologists
Members of the House of Representatives (Japan)
Liberal Party (Japan, 1945) politicians
1954 deaths
20th-century Japanese politicians
20th-century Japanese women politicians